Tholudur Madhurantaka Choleswarar Temple (மதுராந்தக சோளீஸ்வரர் கோவில்) which is a Shiva Temple for Shiva.

References

Hindu temples in Cuddalore district